Robert Coughlin may refer to:

 Robert Lawrence Coughlin (1929–2001), American lawyer and politician
 Robert E. Coughlin, American lawyer
 Robert K. Coughlin, Massachusetts Politician